Eupithecia undulifera is a moth in the family Geometridae. It is found in Iran.

References

Moths described in 1939
undulifera
Moths of the Middle East